Lisle was a Canadian rock band formed in 1967 in Barrie, Ontario.

Biography
Originally named 'Quantity Unknown' and 'Robin and the Hoods', the band produced one hit single in Canada in 1974: "Shelly Made Me Smile" which came from their album, Smile With Lisle (1973), on Bronco Records.

Chambers is currently a member of The Martels.

Members
Bill Chambers - Vocals, Guitar
Brian Mathias - Electric Bass, Vocals
Danny Stephens - Drummer, Vocals

Discography

Albums

Singles

References

External links
SmileWithLisle.com

Canadian rock music groups
Musical groups from Barrie
Musical groups established in 1967
Musical groups established in 1974
1967 establishments in Ontario
1974 disestablishments in Ontario